The 1996 Sweater Shop International Open was a  professional ranking snooker tournament that took place between 17 and 24 February 1996 at the Link Centre in Swindon, England.

John Higgins defended his title by defeating Rod Lawler 9–3 in the final. This was the first time that Lawler reached the final of a ranking event.

Prize fund
The breakdown of prize money for this year is shown below:

 Winner: £60,000
 Runner-up: £32,000
 Semi-final: £16,000
 Quarter-final: £9,050
 Last 16: £4,550
 Last 32: £2,600
 Last 64: £1,900
 Last 96: £700

 Stage one highest break: £1,200
 Stage two highest break: £2,400
 Total: £321,400

Main draw

Final

Century breaks

 144, 129, 104, 100  John Higgins
 127, 106  Dave Harold
 124  John Parrott
 123  Willie Thorne
 119  Ken Doherty
 111  Jim Chambers

 108, 103  Stephen Lee
 107  Wayne Jones
 102  David Finbow
 102  Terry Murphy
 101  Fergal O'Brien
 100  Peter Ebdon

References

1996
International Open
International Open
International Open
Sport in Swindon